Life Will Kill You is the seventh studio album by Swedish rap metal band Clawfinger, released on 27 July 2007 through Nuclear Blast. It was recorded by Clawfinger in Fear and Loathing Studios Spånga – Sweden by themselves. The record is the last album released by the band before their breakup in mid-2013.

Track listing
 "The Price We Pay" – 3:34
 "Life Will Kill You" – 3:34
 "Prisoners" – 3:52
 "Final Stand" – 4:39
 "None the Wiser" – 4:38
 "Little Baby" – 3:46
 "The Cure & the Poison" – 5:53
 "Where Can We Go from Here?" – 4:05
 "It's Your Life" – 3:28
 "Falling" – 3:39
 "Carnivore" – 3:13
 "Dying to Know" – 3:33 (bonus track)
 "Picture Perfect Skies" – 3:35 (bonus track)

Credits
Backing vocals – Barbie Swan 
Cello – Emma Haake 
Cover, design, layout – Joakim Hedestedt, Zak 
Mastered by – Björn Engelmann 
Mixed by – Jocke Skog 
Recorded by [additional recordings] – Bård Torstensen
Written by, recorded by, producer – Clawfinger

Reception

References

External links
 

Clawfinger albums
2007 albums